Paul Frederick Hirsch (born November 14, 1945) is an American film editor with over 40 film credits since 1970, best known as one of the premier filmmakers to come out of the New Hollywood movement, collaborating with directors like Brian De Palma, George Lucas, George A. Romero, and Herbert Ross. He won an Academy Award and Saturn Award for his work on the original Star Wars, which he shared with Richard Chew and Marcia Lucas.

Life and career
A native of New York City, and son of painter Joseph Hirsch. His father was of German-Jewish descent. after graduating from Columbia in 1966, he began to pursue a career in editing. In the late 1960s, while editing trailers in NYC, he was introduced by his brother, Charles, to then unknown filmmaker Brian De Palma. Their collaboration has yielded eleven feature films. 

In 1978, he won the Academy Award for Best Film Editing for his work on Star Wars, along with Richard Chew and Marcia Lucas. He was also the first person to win the Saturn Award for Best Editing twice, first for Star Wars in 1977 and then Mission: Impossible – Ghost Protocol in 2011.

He has edited over 35 feature films, including The Empire Strikes Back, Ferris Bueller's Day Off, Mission: Impossible, Planes, Trains and Automobiles, Footloose, Carrie, Falling Down, Phantom of the Paradise, Obsession, Blow Out, The Secret of My Success, Steel Magnolias and Ray, for which he received a second Academy Award nomination in 2005 and the American Cinema Editors' award for Best Edited Feature Film (Comedy or Musical). He has also worked with Duncan Jones on Source Code and Warcraft.

Hirsch rarely watches movies other than his own more than once. However, he cites that the musical An American in Paris and the science fiction film 2001: A Space Odyssey are worthy of repeat viewing.

Filmography

As film editor

As additional editor

References

External links
 

Living people
American film editors
1945 births
Best Film Editing Academy Award winners
Columbia College (New York) alumni